Werther's Original (from the original German: Werthers Echte) is a brand of caramel  candy owned by the German company August Storck KG, based in Berlin, Germany. The candy is popular in Europe and North America.

History 
The sweet brand is named after the town of Werther in Westphalia, where the company was founded in 1903. In 1969, the sweet began marketing under the brand name Werthers Echte. The brand name Werther's Original was adopted in the 1990s for the international market. They are now manufactured nearby, in Halle (Westfalen).

Product 
The original Werthers Echte was a caramel hard candy. 
Later variants included chewy toffees, and a soft, waxy form which melts easily inside the mouth called "butterscotch-melts."  A variant with chocolate filling is also available, as well as three sugarless variants that use isomalt as a sugar substitute: the original butterscotch flavour, a butterscotch coffee swirl, and a butterscotch mint swirl. A product available in the United Kingdom is "Werther's Chocolate," a dark and milk chocolate with butterscotch running through it, sold in the same packaging and wrappers as Werther's Originals. A variant available in Canada and the United States, "Butterscotch Apple Filled," has a green-apple-flavored filling.

Commercials 
Well-known TV advertisements in Germany and the United Kingdom from the late 1980s featured an older man offering Werther's butterscotch to his grandson.The actor Arnold Peters appeared in them. In the United States commercials, TV actor Robert Rockwell played the kind-hearted grandfather. The grandson was played by Raymond Hewitt.

One of these ads was dubbed into Japanese and aired in Japan in the early 2000s. Its off-putting voice acting led to it becoming an Internet meme in Japan on sites such as 2channel and Nico Nico Douga.

One British advertisement consisted of a montage of the grandfather and grandson bonding together (for example, pointing at animals out of train windows). The lyrics of the song which accompanied this ended: "When one who loves you says to you: You're someone very special too."

References

External links 

  — Official Werther's Original website
 Official USA Website — Storck USA L.P.'s Werther's Original Butterscotch website
 Official Japanese website  — Morinaga Milk Industry Werther's Original website

August Storck brands
German brands
Brand name confectionery
German confectionery